Roberto Fabián Bishara Adawi (born August 18, 1981) is a Palestinian former footballer who played as a defender.

Managerial career
He began his managerial career at the Palestino youth ranks. Next, he worked as the assistant coach of both Nicolás Córdova and Omar Toloza. He returned to the youth categories, getting the 2022 Chilean Youth Championship at under-17 level.

Personal life
Bishara is a Palestinian Christian (Roman Catholic). Both his father and his grandfather were born in Palestine.

Honours

Player
Palestino
 Primera División de Chile runner-up: 2008 Clausura

Manager
Palestino U17
 Chilean Youth Championship: 2022

References

External links 
 
 
 

1981 births
Living people
Footballers from Santiago
Chilean footballers
Chilean people of Palestinian descent
Citizens of the State of Palestine through descent
Palestine international footballers
Palestinian footballers
Santiago Wanderers footballers
Club Deportivo Universidad Católica footballers
Club Deportivo Palestino footballers
Chilean Primera División players
Chilean football managers
Palestinian football managers
Association football defenders